Robert Grose House is a historic home located near Port Penn, New Castle County, Delaware.  It was built in the late-19th century, and is a two-story, two-bay, side-gable, one-room plan frame building with a -story, shed-roofed frame wing.  It has an additional one-story, shed-roofed frame addition on the south elevation and a one-story, shed-roofed porch dated to the first quarter of the 20th century.  The house is a typical example for a physically identifiable vernacular property type, identified as a "House and Garden".

It was listed on the National Register of Historic Places in 2001.

References

Houses on the National Register of Historic Places in Delaware
Houses in New Castle County, Delaware
National Register of Historic Places in New Castle County, Delaware